The Partisan of Villa (Spanish:La guerrillera de Villa) is a 1967 Spanish-Mexican comedy film directed by Miguel Morayta and starring Carmen Sevilla, Julio Alemán, and Vicente Parra. It is set in 1913 during the Mexican Revolution.

Cast

References

Bibliography
 Sílvia Martinez & Héctor Fouce. Made in Spain: Studies in Popular Music. Routledge, 2013.

External links 

1967 films
1960s historical comedy films
Mexican historical comedy films
Spanish historical comedy films
1960s Spanish-language films
Films directed by Miguel Morayta
Mexican Revolution films
Films set in Mexico
Films set in the 1910s
Films set in 1913
Films scored by Manuel Esperón
1960s Spanish films
1960s Mexican films